Melibaeopsis is a genus of beetles in the family Buprestidae, containing the following species:

 Melibaeopsis angolana (Obenberger, 1931)
 Melibaeopsis benguelae (Obenberger, 1922)
 Melibaeopsis carinata (Quedenfeldt, 1888)
 Melibaeopsis chlorolineata (Quedenfeldt, 1886)
 Melibaeopsis costata (Kerremans, 1908)
 Melibaeopsis costipennis (Kerremans, 1907)
 Melibaeopsis monardi Thery, 1931
 Melibaeopsis nigroaenea Thery, 1940
 Melibaeopsis overlaeti Thery, 1940
 Melibaeopsis quarrei (Burgeon, 1941)
 Melibaeopsis rufipecta (Quedenfeldt, 1886)
 Melibaeopsis schoutedeni (Obenberger, 1922)
 Melibaeopsis tricolor Thery, 1947

References

Buprestidae genera